Dolishte is a village in Kardzhali Municipality, Kardzhali Province, southern Bulgaria.

Population 
According to the 2011 census, the village of Dolishte has 77 inhabitants, down from its peak of 261 in 1965. Nearly all inhabitants are ethnic  Turks (97%).

References

Villages in Kardzhali Province